Oklahoma Lake is located in north east Oklahoma City in the Canadian river valley and borders the North Canadian River by Westminster Road. The lake is fed from ground water and the water is usually calm because of the low elevation. The primary fish species are crappie, bass, and channel catfish. Oklahoma Lake activities include swimming, camping, picnics, fishing, and jet-ski sports.

References

Geography of Oklahoma City
Lakes of Oklahoma
Tourist attractions in Oklahoma City
Bodies of water of Canadian County, Oklahoma